This is a list of Orkney islands in Scotland. In addition to the Orkney Mainland there are three groups of islands. The North and South Isles lie respectively north and south of Mainland. The Pentland Skerries are a group of small islands in the Pentland Firth, a dangerous stretch of water between mainland Scotland and the larger islands of Orkney, through which run the strongest tidal streams in Britain. The Island of Stroma is often mistakenly included with the Orkney Islands, but is part of Caithness.

The definition of an island used in this list is that it is 'land that is surrounded by seawater on a daily basis, but not necessarily at all stages of the tide, excluding human devices such as bridges and causeways'. There are four islands joined to the Orkney Mainland by a series of causeways known as the Churchill Barriers. They are South Ronaldsay, Burray, Lamb Holm and Glimps Holm. In addition, Hunda is connected to Burray by a causeway. The barriers were constructed by Italian prisoners-of-war as a means of preventing enemy submarine access to the vast natural harbour of Scapa Flow after the sinking of HMS Royal Oak by a German U-boat in 1939 with the loss of 883 lives. The Italian prisoners constructed a small Roman Catholic chapel on Lamb Holm as a place of worship during their incarceration.

Most of the islands have a bedrock formed from Old Red Sandstone, which is about 400 million years old, and was laid down in the Devonian period. The islands have good agricultural qualities and have been continuously inhabited for thousands of years, as evidenced by the World Heritage Site of the Heart of Neolithic Orkney. The archipelago is exposed to wind and tide, and there are numerous lighthouses as an aid to navigation. The European Marine Energy Centre, which is located at Stromness, is currently testing various wave and tidal energy devices from Billia Croo on the Mainland and Eday. The islands all fall within the Orkney Islands Council area. Most of the larger islands have development trusts that support the local economy.

The total population of Orkney increased from 19,245 in 2001 to 21,349 at the time of the 2011 census.

Main list

This is a list of islands with an area greater than 15 hectares (approximately 37 acres). Records for the last date of settlement for the smaller uninhabited islands are incomplete, but all of the islands listed here would have been inhabited at some point during the Neolithic, Pictish or Norse periods.

'Ward Hill' or a variant thereof is very common as the name of the highest point on the island. These locations are named after those high places used for the lighting of warning beacons. 

The population of the tidal islet of Holm of Grimbister was not recorded by the 2001 census, although it was inhabited in 2010 and probably earlier. It did appear in the 2011 tables.

The population of Inner Holm in 2001 was one, although the figure was included in the total for Mainland at the time of the 2001 census.

Lamb Holm is "included in the NRS statistical geography for inhabited islands but had no usual residents at the time of either the 2001 or 2011 censuses".

Papa Stronsay had usually resident population of 10 in 2001 but was apparently not permanently inhabited in 2011.

Smaller islets and skerries
 

This is a continuing list of uninhabited smaller Orkney islands (many of which are called "Holm" from the Old Norse holmr, meaning a small and rounded islet), tidal islets only separated at higher stages of the tide, or skerries which are only exposed at lower stages of the tide.

In the vicinity of:
Auskerry: Lunga Skerries, Oessen Skerry, The Clett.
Calf of Eday: Lashy Skerries, The Bow.
Cava: Barrel of Butter.
Copinsay: Black Holm, Corn Holm, Horse of Copinsay, Scarf Skerry, Sow Skerry, Ward Holm.
Eday: Green Holm, Red Holm, Rusk Holm.
Egilsay: Kili Holm.
Eynhallow: Sheep Skerry.
Gairsay: Holm of Boray, Holm of Rendall, Little Seal Skerry,  Skertours, Taing Skerry.
Glimps Holm: Dulse Skerry, Glimpsholm Skerry.
Graemsay: Middle Skerry, Skerry of Cletts, Sour Skerry, Sow Skerry.
Hoy: Grassy Cletts, Inner Skerry, Middle Skerry, Old Man of Hoy, Outer Skerry, The Needle.
Mainland: Bo Skerry, Bow Skerries, Braga, Brough of Bigging, Holm of Houton, Holm of Rendall, Iceland Skerry, Kirk Rocks, Little Skerry, Mirkady Point, Nevi Skerry, Outer Holm, Oyster Skerries, Puldrite Skerry, Quanterness Skerry, Scare Gun, Seal Skerry, Skaill Skerries, Skerries of Clestrain, Skerries of Coubister, Skerries of Lakequoy, Skerry of Work, Skerry of Yinstay, Smoogro Skerry, Thieves Holm, Whyabatten, Yesnaby Castle.
Muckle Skerry: Clettack Skerry, Little Skerry, Louther Skerry.
North Ronaldsay: Altars of Linnay, Green Skerry, Hoe Skerries, Reefdyke, Seal Skerry.
Papa Stronsay: Jack's Hole, Jack's Reef.
Papa Westray: Cairn Head, Muckle Quoy.
Rousay: Little Brig, Muckle Brig.
Sanday: Baa Gruna, 
Shapinsay:  Broad Shoal, Grass Holm, Skerry of Vasa.
Stronsay: Holms of Spurness, Ingale Skerry, Little Linga, The Bow.
Swona: Selki Skerry, South Clett, The Tails of the Tarff, West Wini Skerry.
Westray: Holm of Aikerness, Shell Holm, Skea Skerries, Wart Holm.
Wyre: Wyre Skerries.

See also

 List of places in Orkney
 List of Shetland islands
 List of Outer Hebrides
 List of islands of Scotland
 List of the largest islands in the North Sea

References and footnotes

General references
 
 
 
Omand, Donald (ed.) (2003) The Orkney Book. Edinburgh. Birlinn. 
Specific references and notes

Orkney

Islands